Ronald Snijders (born April 8, 1951) is a Dutch jazz musician and author of Surinamese origin. The flute is his main instrument.

Biography 
Snijders was born in Paramaribo as son of Surinamese composer Eddy Snijder. He began learning the flute at the age of seven years. Later he also played guitar, piano, percussion and saxophone. In 1970, he moved to the Netherlands to study engineering at the Technical University Delft. Then he stayed in Europe to work as a musician, he first played for Willem Breuker, whose collective deep he served until 1977. In 1973, he won the NOS Jazz Concours in Laren. Since 1977, he has focused on working with his own band, with which he also appeared at the North Sea Jazz Festival, as in many European countries, but also in Western and Southern Africa, the Caribbean and North America. In his compositions he often draws on Kaseko, a musical genre of his homeland, but also to elements of pop and world music. With Kaseko he worked intensively during his musicological studies, which he completed from 1986 to 1991 at the University of Amsterdam. On his albums he played alongside ethno-jazz also children's songs and the compositions of his father. He has also performed with the Metropole Orchestra.

As an author he has submitted a biography of his father, and a collection of short stories.

He was appointed a Knight of the Order of Orange-Nassau in 2001.

Discography 
 Natural Sources (1977)
 "A Safe Return" (1980)
 "Black Straight Music" (1981)
 Quartz (1983)
 Funky Flute (1985)
 Portable Beach (1992)
 Kaseko Mundial! Live (1996)
 Meet the World (1998)
 The Best Of (1999)
 Variyento (2004)
 West by West / Soulkawina (2005)
 Ronald Snyders to Africa (2005)
 Ronald Snijders extended funk band (2008)
 The Nelson & Djosa Sessions (2016)

Bibliography 
 Surinaams van de straat (1994), 
 Surinam Kaseko melodies (1996), Notes) 
 Geef mij maar een Surinamer (1996), 
 De man met de piccolo (1998; Biography of Eddy Snijders),

External links
 Official website

1951 births
Living people
Dutch flautists
Dutch male short story writers
Dutch short story writers
People from Paramaribo
Surinamese emigrants to the Netherlands
Knights of the Order of Orange-Nassau